Max Franz (born 1 September 1989) is an Austrian World Cup alpine ski racer.
Born in Klagenfurt, Carinthia, he focuses on the speed events of Downhill and Super-G.

Career 
Franz made his World Cup debut in November 2009 at Lake Louise, Canada. Three years later, Franz made his first World Cup podium in November 2012, in the Downhill at Lake Louise.

He is the cousin of alpine skier Werner Franz.

In 2017, Franz took his first World Cup win in Val Gardena in the downhill. He has two other wins in the World Cup, namely in Super G and another one in downhill. He also succeeded in the World Championships of 2017, where he achieved third place.

During a training event in Copper Mountain (USA), Franz fell and suffered fractures in both lower legs, making him unable to participate in the 2022/23 World Cup and the 2023 World Championships.

World cup results

Race podiums
3 wins – (2 DH, 1 SG)
10 podiums – (6 DH, 4 SG)

Season standings

^

World Championship results

Olympic results

References

External links

Max Franz World Cup standings at the International Ski Federation

Max Franz at Austrian Ski team official site 
Max Franz at Atomic Skis
 

Austrian male alpine skiers
1989 births
Living people
Alpine skiers at the 2014 Winter Olympics
Alpine skiers at the 2018 Winter Olympics
Alpine skiers at the 2022 Winter Olympics
Olympic alpine skiers of Austria
Sportspeople from Klagenfurt